Luciano Valente may refer to:

 Luciano Valente (footballer, born 1981), Brazilian footballer
 Luciano Valente (footballer, born 2003), Italian footballer